Jean Guitton (29 March 1887 - 8 April 1973) was a French dramatist, librettist, lyricist and screenwriter.

Filmography 
Les Dévoyés, directed by Henri Vorins (France, 1926, based on the play La Nuit du 3) 
, directed by Nicolas Rimsky and Roger Lion (France, 1926, based on the play Jim la Houlette, roi des voleurs) 
, directed by Léo Joannon (France, 1934, based on the play On a trouvé une femme nue) 
, directed by André Berthomieu (France, 1935, based on the play Jim la Houlette, roi des voleurs) 
, directed by Maurice Cammage (France, 1937, based on the play Fallait pas m'écraser) 
Forty Little Mothers, directed by Busby Berkeley (1940, remake of the 1936 film Forty Little Mothers) 
, directed by Jean Loubignac (France, 1949, based on the play Et la police n'en savait rien) 
, directed by Émile Couzinet (France, 1952, based on the play Le Curé de Saint-Amour) 
, directed by Yves Ciampi (France, 1952, based on the play Je l'aimais trop) 
Au diable la vertu, directed by Jean Laviron (France, 1953, based on the play Elle attendait ça) 
, directed by René Jayet (France, 1953, loose remake of the 1936 film Forty Little Mothers) 
Légère et court vêtue, directed by Jean Laviron (France, 1953, based on the play Un amour fou) 
, directed by Paul Mesnier (France, 1957, based on the operetta Une nuit aux Baléares)

Screenwriter 

 1930: The Prosecutor Hallers, by Robert Wiene
 1931: The Man at Midnight, by Harry Lachman
 1932: Mise en plis, by Jacques Desagneaux
 1932: , by Léo Joannon
 1933: La Femme invisible, by Georges Lacombe
 1934: Rothchild, by Marco de Gastyne
 1936: Les Gaîtés de la finance, by Jack Forrester
 1936: Forty Little Mothers, by Léonide Moguy
 1937: The Club of Aristocrats, by Pierre Colombier
 1937: The Kings of Sport , by Pierre Colombier
 1937: , by André Berthomieu
 1938: , by Robert Péguy
 1938: , by Fernand Rivers
 1941: The Acrobat, by Jean Boyer
 1943: , by Jacques Houssin
 1948:Woman Without a Past, by Gilles Grangier
 1949: My Aunt from Honfleur, by René Jayet
 1950: , by Jean Loubignac
 1956: , by Jean Loubignac
 1963: The Bamboo Stroke, by Jean Boyer

Operettas 
1919: Chaste Suzy 
1920: Clo-Clo 
1928: L'Hostellerie de la vertu 
1930: Six filles à marier 
1931: Couss-Couss
1954: Une nuit aux Baléares. Operetta (with Loulou Gasté and )

Plays 
1924 : On a trouvé une femme nue. Comedy in three acts (with André Birabeau). Premiered in Paris at the Théâtre des Nouveautés
1924 : La Nuit du 3. Drama in four acts. Premiered in Paris at the Eldorado
1926 : Jim la Houlette, roi des voleurs. Play in three acts
1935 : Fallait pas m'écraser. Vaudeville in two acts. Premiered in Paris at the Théâtre de la Renaissance
1936 : Elle attendait ça. Vaudeville in three acts. Premiered in Paris at the Théâtre du Palais-Royal
1945 : Un amour fou. Vaudeville in three acts
1949 : Et la police n'en savait rien. Premiered in Paris at the Théâtre Sarah Bernhardt
1951 : Je l'aimais trop. Comedy in three acts. Premiered in Paris at the Théâtre Saint-Georges
Before 1952 : Le Curé de Saint-Amour. Play in three acts

References

External links 
 
 Jean Guitton, librettiste sur le site La Comédie musicale en France

20th-century French dramatists and playwrights
French lyricists
20th-century French screenwriters
1887 births
1973 deaths